Piyaz (Persian: پیاز, Kurdish: pivaz, piyaz  for "onion" or salad) is a kind of Turkish cuisine, Turkish cuisine and Persian salad or meze that is made from any kind of dry beans with  onion, parsley and sumac. The name of Piyaz derives from old Iranian word of "pidāz" for onion, later on this name was adopted for salad or mezes made with onion. In Antalya province of Turkey it is prepared differently from other regions with other ingredients like tahini (crushed sesame seeds). In Antalya, piyaz is not considered a salad but a main dish. In southern provinces like Adana, the word piyaz is used to refer to an onion and sumac salad. During the Ottoman period, piyaz was also made from artichoke, pea, chickpea, broad bean and potato, which were introduced to Turkey in the last quarter of the 19th century.

See also
 Pilaki
 Kuru fasulye
 Kurdish cuisine
 Turkish cuisine
 List of salads

References

External links
Piyaz - Kurdish Union Salad
Piyaz recipe
Piyaz article in The Jerusalem Post

Turkish words and phrases
Persian words and phrases
Meze
Turkish salads